Caecilia thompsoni, commonly called Thompson's caecilian, is a species of caecilian in the family Caeciliidae. It is endemic to Colombia. It is the largest of the worm-like caecilians and reaches a length of 1.5 m (5 ft) and can weigh up to about 1 kg (2.2 lb). Its natural habitats are subtropical or tropical moist lowland forest, subtropical or tropical moist montane forest, plantations, rural gardens, and heavily degraded former forest.

References

thompsoni
Amphibians of Colombia
Endemic fauna of Colombia
Amphibians described in 1902
Taxonomy articles created by Polbot